The 2008 CFL Draft took place on Wednesday, April 30, 2008, live at 12:00 PM ET on TSN.ca.  A total of 48 players were chosen from among 752 eligible players from Canadian Universities across the country, as well as Canadian players playing in the NCAA. Of the 48 draft selections, 33 players were drafted from Canadian Interuniversity Sport institutions.

The first two rounds were broadcast on TSN.ca with host Rod Black. CFL Commissioner Mark Cohon was in the studio to announce each selection.  The CFL on TSN panel included Duane Forde, Greg Marshall, Brian Towriss,  Farhan Lalji, Jock Climie, Matt Dunigan, and Chris Schultz who analyzed the teams' needs and picks.

The Hamilton Tiger-Cats, with the league-worst 3–15 record in the 2007 CFL season had several offers for their first-overall selection but kept their pick and chose Saskatchewan Huskies safety Dylan Barker.  Barker, a native of  Moose Jaw, Saskatchewan is a two-time Canadian Interuniversity Sport first-team all-Canadian. He led the Huskies with 53 tackles, three interceptions, and four breakups last season. It is expected that he will be able to help the Tiger-Cats in the 2008 CFL season.

Forfeitures
 Montreal forfeited their first round selection after a CFL investigation found that they had exceeded the league salary cap by $108,285 (the minimum for a forfeiture is $100,000). That draft pick (originally the fourth overall) reverted to the Hamilton Tiger-Cats at the end of the first round as they were first in the order of waiver priority after finishing last in the 2007 standings.

Draft order

Round one

Round two

Round three

Round four

Round five

Round six

References

Canadian College Draft
CFL Draft